George Home may refer to:

George Home, 4th Lord Home (died 1549), Scottish nobleman
George Home (Comptroller of Scotland) (1552–1615), Comptroller of the Scottish Exchequer
George Home, 1st Earl of Dunbar (c. 1556–1611)
Sir George Home, 7th Baronet (died 1803)

See also
George Hume (disambiguation)